Baltimore was a small town built on the western banks of the Wabash River in Mound Township, Warren County, in the U.S. state of Indiana.

History
Baltimore was laid out in November 1829 by William Willmeth and Samuel Hill.  It flourished for several years, and the population reached 70.  In 1830, Samuel Hill had a stock of merchandise worth $2500 at his establishment, which was the largest stock in the county at the time. A post office was established in 1833, and remained in operation until it was discontinued in 1865. Another store was opened by Samuel Wetzel in 1839.  When the Wabash and Erie Canal was completed on the opposite side of the river in the 1840s, the community dwindled. A single brick house built in the 1880s is the last remaining structure of Baltimore.

Geography 
Baltimore was located at 40°09'57" North, 87°26'31" West (40.165833, -87.441944). The site is along State Road 263 near its intersection with County Road 1025 South. Baltimore Cemetery and Rodgers Cemetery lie about a quarter mile to the west.

References 

 Warren County Historical Society. A History of Warren County, Indiana (175th Anniversary Edition) (2002).
 

Ghost towns in Indiana
Former populated places in Warren County, Indiana
Populated places established in 1829
1829 establishments in Indiana